Charles Walker (died 1887) was a liturgist and author. He was associated with St Michael's, Brighton, in the 1860s.

The Ritual Reason Why

Walker wrote and edited two editions of the book The Ritual Reason Why (1st Edition, 1866; Second enlarged Edition, 1868 - published by J.T. Hayes of 17 Henrietta Street, Covent Garden). This book was "designed to give a rationale of ceremonial worship" in the Church of England. Walker was moved by the conviction that "much of the opposition to ritual" in the Anglican Church was "due to a mistaken or inadequate view of its meaning and intention". Further, he noted that "Scripture itself teaches us the duty of instructing the people in the rationale of divine ceremonial; the objective end of which it is that it 'may be a sign among us, that when our children ask – what mean ye by these things,' we may 'Answer them.'" (Joshua 4:6).

Other works

Other publications include: The Liturgy of the Church of Sarum; The Services of the Church; Oswald, the Young Artist – a Tale for Boys ("inculcating the necessity of a reverential attention when assisting in the public worship"); A Prayer Book for the Young; and Devotions on the Communion of Saints.

See also

Anglo-Catholicism
Ritualism

References

External links
 Bibliographic directory from Project Canterbury
 The Ritual Reason Why

Anglican liturgists
British Anglo-Catholics
19th-century Anglicans
Anglo-Catholic writers